The Cooperative Institute for Mesoscale Meteorological Studies is a research organization created in 1978 by a cooperative agreement between the University of Oklahoma (OU) and the National Oceanic and Atmospheric Administration (NOAA). CIMMS promotes collaborative research between NOAA and OU scientists on problems of mutual interest to improve basic understanding of mesoscale meteorological phenomena, weather radar, and regional climate to help produce better forecasts and warnings that save lives and property. CIMMS research contributes to the NOAA mission through improvement of the observation, analysis, understanding, and prediction of weather elements and systems and climate anomalies ranging in size from cloud nuclei to multi-state areas.

It is one of 16 NOAA Cooperative Institutes (CIs). On Oct. 1, 2021, CIMMS transitioned to become the new NOAA Cooperative Institute for Severe and High-Impact Weather Research and Operations (CIWRO), hosted at the University of Oklahoma. 

CIMMS concentrates its research and outreach efforts and resources on the following principal themes:
 Weather Radar Research and Development
 Stormscale and Mesoscale Modeling Research and Development
 Forecast Improvements Research and Development
 Impacts of Climate Change Related to Extreme Weather Events
 Social and Socioeconomic Impacts of High Impact Weather Systems

National Weather Center 
CIMMS is part of the National Weather Center, a unique confederation of federal, state, and OU organizations that work together in partnership to improve understanding of the Earth's atmosphere. Recognized for its collective expertise in severe weather, many of the research and development activities of the Center have served society by improving weather observing and forecasting, and thus have contributed to reductions in loss of life and property. Many entities of the National Weather Center played a key role in the decade-long, $2 billion modernization and restructuring of the National Weather Service. National Weather Center organizations employ 650 individuals and provide more than $45 million annually to the Oklahoma economy. Today, all organizations are collocated in the new National Weather Center facility, which was completed in 2006 at a cost of $69 million.

Collaboration 
CIMMS promotes cooperation and collaboration on problems of mutual interest among OU research scientists and students and the NOAA Office of Oceanic and Atmospheric Research (OAR) National Severe Storms Laboratory, NOAA Air Resources Laboratory, National Weather Service Radar Operations Center for the WSR-88D (NEXRAD) Program, NWS National Centers for Environmental Prediction Storm Prediction Center, NWS Warning Decision Training Division, the NWS Forecast Office in Norman, Oklahoma, and the NWS Training Center located in Kansas City, Missouri.

References

External links 
 
CIMMS transitions to CIWRO

Office of Oceanic and Atmospheric Research
Research institutes in Oklahoma
Meteorological research institutes
University of Oklahoma
Research institutes established in 1978
1978 establishments in Oklahoma